Edge Lane is a tram stop on the East Manchester Line (EML) of Greater Manchester's light-rail Metrolink system. It opened on 11 February 2013, after a three-day free trial for local residents. The station was constructed as part of Phase 3a of the Metrolink's expansion, and is located at the junction of Manchester Road and Edge Lane, in Droylsden, Tameside, England.

Services
Services are mostly every 12 minutes on all routes.

Connecting bus routes
Edge Lane is directly served by Stagecoach Manchester bus services 216 and 231, which stops next to the station on Manchester Road, with the 216 replicating the tram route between Piccadilly Gardens and Ashton-under-Lyne, while the 231 runs between Manchester and Ashton via Littlemoss and Smallshaw.

Stagecoach/JPT services 217 and 218, which also stops on Manchester Road, run circular routes between Manchester and Mossley serving Droylsden, Dukinfield, Ashton, Tameside General Hospital and Stalybridge.

References

External links

Edge Lane Stop Information
Edge Lane area map
 Light Rail Transit Association

Tram stops in Tameside
Tram stops on the Bury to Ashton-under-Lyne line